Sonia Ruth Zakrzewski  is a bioarchaeologist and Associate Professor at the University of Southampton.

Career
She is a member of the Paleopathology Association, and on the organising board of the Society for the Study of Human Biology (SSHB) and the British Association for Biological Anthropology & Osteoarchaeology (BABAO). She was elected as a fellow of the Society of Antiquaries of London on 11 November 2011.

Select publications
Wright, S. S. E., Dickinson, A., & Zakrzewski, S. (2020). Getting to grips with 3D printed bones: using 3D models as ‘diagrams’ to improve accessibility of palaeopathological data. Papers from the Institute of Archaeology 29(1). .
Woods, C., Fernee, C., Browne, M., Zakrzewski, S., & Dickinson, A. (2017). The potential of statistical shape modelling for geometric morphometric analysis of human teeth in archaeological research. PLoS ONE, 12(12), [e0186754]. .
Carton, J., Pollard, J., & Zakrzewski, S. (2016). An early Neolithic mortuary deposit from the Woodford G2 long barrow. Wiltshire Archaeological and Natural History Magazine, 109, 79–90.
Inskip, S. A., Taylor, G. M., Zakrzewski, S. R., Mays, S., Pike, A. W. G., Llewellyn, G., ... Stewart, G. R. (2015). Osteological, biomolecular and geochemical examination of an Early Anglo-Saxon case of lepromatous leprosy. PLoS ONE, 10(5), 1–128. [e0124282]. .
Cashmore, L., & Zakrzewski, S. R. (2013). Assessment of musculoskeletal stress marker development in the hand. International Journal of Osteoarchaeology, 23(3), 334–347. .

References

Living people
Year of birth missing (living people)
Fellows of the Society of Antiquaries of London
British women archaeologists
21st-century archaeologists
Academics of the University of Southampton
Alumni of the University of Cambridge